The 1910 Minnesota lieutenant gubernatorial election took place on November 8, 1910. Republican Party of Minnesota candidate Samuel Y. Gordon defeated Minnesota Democratic Party challenger Merrill C. Tifft, Public Ownership Party candidate Lewis M. Ayer, and Prohibition Party candidate J. D. Engle.

Results

External links
 Election Returns

Lieutenant Gubernatorial
1910

Minnesota